The Rural Municipality of Webb No. 138 is a rural municipality (RM) in the Canadian province of Saskatchewan within Census Division No. 8 and  Division No. 3. It is located in the southwest portion of the province.

History 
The RM of Webb No. 138 incorporated as a rural municipality on December 13, 1909.

Geography

Communities and localities 
The following urban municipalities are surrounded by the RM.

Villages
 Webb

The following unincorporated communities are within the RM.

Localities
Melaval
Woodrow

Demographics 

Government 
The RM of Webb No. 138 is governed by an elected municipal council and an appointed administrator that meets on the second Thursday of every month. The reeve of the RM is Dennis Fiddler while its administrator is Raylene Packet. The RM's office is located in Webb.

References 

Webb
 
Division No. 8, Saskatchewan